Oakdale School may refer to:

 Oakdale Comprehensive School in Oakdale, Caerphilly county, Wales
 Any of several schools named Oakdale High School (disambiguation)
 Oakdale Public School in Oakdale, Pennsylvania
 Oakdale School (Madison, Indiana), included in National Register of Historic Places listings in Jefferson County, Indiana
 Oakdale School (Tennessee) in Oakdale, Tennessee
 Oakdale Junior School in  Poole, Dorset

See also
 Oakdale Joint Unified School District (California)
 Oakdale (disambiguation)